Ann O'Grady Bagnall (25 March 1927 - 8 September 2017) was a British school teacher and publisher who specialised in republishing historic cookbooks.

Biography
She was born Ann Haly in Edinburgh on 25 March 1927, the daughter of John Haly, a naval officer, and his wife Marie. She was raised in Bexhill on Sea. She was educated at Ancaster Gate School but did not attend university, instead working as a chambermaid after her father fell on hard times. She paid her own fees to attend art college in Devon and then the Central School of Arts and Crafts in London.

Bagnall worked as an art teacher in schools in East Sussex. Late in life she had the idea to reprint old cookbooks and in 1987 set up her own publishing company, Southover Press, which was very successful in finding forgotten Tudor and Georgian works. She retired and sold the list to Equinox Books in 2007.

Ann Haly married the education journalist Nicholas Bagnall at Battle (Hastings) in 1953. She died in 2017, aged 90 years.

References 

1927 births
2017 deaths
Publishers (people) from Edinburgh
Schoolteachers from Sussex
British publishers (people)
20th-century British businesspeople